The 1916 New York Yankees season was the club's  14th season. The team finished with a record of 80–74, finishing 11 games behind the American League champion Boston Red Sox. New York was managed by Bill Donovan. Their home games were played at the Polo Grounds.

Opening game
The game was on April 20, 1916, at Griffith Stadium against the Washington Senators. President Woodrow Wilson threw out the ceremonial first pitch. The Senators, behind Walter Johnson, defeated New York, 12-4.

Regular season

Season standings

Record vs. opponents

Roster

Player stats

Batting

Starters by position 
Note: Pos = Position; G = Games played; AB = At bats; H = Hits; Avg. = Batting average; HR = Home runs; RBI = Runs batted in

Other batters 
Note: G = Games played; AB = At bats; H = Hits; Avg. = Batting average; HR = Home runs; RBI = Runs batted in

Pitching

Starting pitchers 
Note: G = Games pitched; IP = Innings pitched; W = Wins; L = Losses; ERA = Earned run average; SO = Strikeouts

Other pitchers 
Note: G = Games pitched; IP = Innings pitched; W = Wins; L = Losses; ERA = Earned run average; SO = Strikeouts

Relief pitchers 
Note: G = Games pitched; W = Wins; L = Losses; SV = Saves; ERA = Earned run average; SO = Strikeouts

References

Further reading
1916 New York Yankees team page at www.baseball-almanac.com
1916 New York Yankees page at Baseball Reference

New York Yankees seasons
New York Yankees
New York Yankees
1910s in Manhattan
Washington Heights, Manhattan